The Northrop/McDonnell Douglas YF-23 is an American single-seat, twin-engine stealth fighter aircraft technology demonstrator designed for the United States Air Force (USAF). The design was a finalist in the USAF's Advanced Tactical Fighter (ATF) competition, battling the Lockheed YF-22 for a production contract. Two YF-23 prototypes were built, nicknamed "Black Widow II" and "Gray Ghost".

In the 1980s, the USAF began looking for a replacement for its fighter aircraft, especially to counter the USSR's advanced Sukhoi Su-27 and Mikoyan MiG-29. Several companies submitted design proposals; the USAF selected proposals from Northrop and Lockheed. Northrop teamed with McDonnell Douglas to develop the YF-23, while Lockheed, Boeing, and General Dynamics developed the YF-22.

The YF-23 was stealthier and faster, but less agile than its competitor. After a four-year development and evaluation process, the YF-22 was announced the winner in 1991 and entered production as the Lockheed Martin F-22 Raptor. The U.S. Navy considered using the production version of the ATF as the basis for a replacement to the F-14, but these plans were later canceled. The two YF-23 prototypes are currently museum exhibits.

Development
American reconnaissance satellites first spotted the advanced Soviet Su-27 and MiG-29 fighter prototypes in 1978, which caused concern in the U.S. Both Soviet models were expected to reduce the maneuverability advantage of contemporary US fighter aircraft. In 1981, the USAF requested information from several aerospace companies on possible features for an Advanced Tactical Fighter (ATF) to replace the F-15 Eagle. After discussions with aerospace companies, the USAF made air-to-air combat the primary role for the ATF. The ATF was to take advantage of emerging technologies, including composite materials, lightweight alloys, advanced flight-control systems, more powerful propulsion systems, and stealth technology. In October 1985, the USAF issued a request for proposal (RFP) to several aircraft manufacturers. The RFP was modified in May 1986 to include the evaluation of prototype air vehicles from the two finalists. At the same time, the U.S. Navy, under the Navalized Advanced Tactical Fighter (NATF) program, announced that it would use a derivative of the ATF winner to replace its F-14 Tomcat. The NATF program called for the procurement of 546 aircraft along with the USAF's planned procurement of 750 aircraft.

In July 1986, proposals for Demonstration and Validation (Dem/Val) were submitted by Lockheed, Boeing, General Dynamics, McDonnell Douglas, Northrop, Grumman and Rockwell; the latter two dropped out of competition shortly thereafter. Northrop’s design proposal (DP) was internally designated DP110. Following proposal submissions, Lockheed, Boeing, and General Dynamics formed a team to develop whichever of their proposed designs was selected, if any. Northrop and McDonnell Douglas formed a team with a similar agreement. The Lockheed and Northrop proposals were selected as finalists on 31 October 1986 for Dem/Val. Both teams were given 50 months to build and flight-test their prototypes, and they were successful, producing the Lockheed YF-22 and the Northrop YF-23.

The YF-23 was designed to meet USAF requirements for survivability, supercruise, stealth, and ease of maintenance. Supercruise requirements called for prolonged supersonic flight without the use of afterburners. Northrop drew on its experience with the B-2 Spirit and F/A-18 Hornet to reduce the model's susceptibility to radar and infrared detection. The USAF initially required the aircraft to land and stop within , which meant the use of thrust reversers on their engines. This allowed the aircraft to have smaller engine nacelle housings. The nacelles were not downsized on the prototypes.

The first YF-23 (serial number 87-0800), Prototype Air Vehicle 1 (PAV-1), was rolled out on 22 June 1990; PAV-1 took its 50-minute maiden flight on 27 August with Alfred "Paul" Metz at the controls. The second YF-23 (serial number 87-0801, PAV-2) made its first flight on 26 October, piloted by Jim Sandberg. The first YF-23 was painted charcoal gray and was nicknamed "Black Widow II", after the Northrop P-61 Black Widow of World War II. It briefly had a red hourglass marking resembling the marking on the underside of the black widow spider before Northrop management had it removed. The second prototype was painted in two shades of gray and nicknamed "Spider" and "Gray Ghost".

Naval variant
A proposed naval variant of the YF-23 known as the NATF-23 was considered as an F-14 Tomcat replacement. The original YF-23 design was first considered but would have had issues with flight deck space handling, storage, landing, and catapult launching reasons requiring a different design. A NATF-23 wind tunnel test model DP527, tested for 14,000 hours, was donated by Boeing in 2001 to the Bellefontaine Neighbors Klein Park Veterans Memorial.

Design

The YF-23 (internally designated DP117K) was an unconventional-looking aircraft, with diamond-shaped wings, a profile with substantial area-ruling to reduce aerodynamic drag at transonic and supersonic speeds, and an all-moving V-tail. The cockpit was placed high, near the nose of the aircraft for good visibility for the pilot. The aircraft featured a tricycle landing gear configuration with a nose landing gear leg and two main landing gear legs. The weapons bay was placed on the underside of the fuselage between the nose and main landing gear. The cockpit has a center stick and side throttle.

It was powered by two turbofan engines with each in a separate engine nacelle with S-ducts, to shield engine axial compressors from radar waves, on either side of the aircraft's spine. The inlets were trapezoidal in frontal profile, with special porous panels in front to absorb the turbulent boundary layer and vent it over the wings. Of the two aircraft built, the first YF-23 (PAV-1) was fitted with Pratt & Whitney YF119 engines, while the second (PAV-2) was powered by General Electric YF120 engines. The aircraft featured single-expansion ramp nozzles (SERN) and unlike the YF-22, does not employ thrust vectoring. As on the B-2, the exhaust from the YF-23's engines flowed through troughs lined with tiles that are “transpiration cooled” to dissipate heat and shield the engines from infrared homing (IR) missile detection from below.

The flight control surfaces were controlled by a central management computer system. Raising the wing flaps and ailerons on one side and lowering them on the other provided roll. The V-tail fins were angled 50 degrees from the vertical. Pitch was mainly provided by rotating these V-tail fins in opposite directions so their front edges moved together or apart. Yaw was primarily supplied by rotating the tail fins in the same direction. Test pilot Paul Metz stated that the YF-23 had superior high angle of attack (AoA) performance compared to legacy aircraft, with trimmed AoA of up to 60°. Deflecting the wing flaps down and ailerons up on both sides simultaneously provided for aerodynamic braking. To keep prototyping costs low despite the novel design, a number of "commercial off-the-shelf" components were used, including an F-15 nose wheel, F/A-18 main landing gear parts, and the forward cockpit components of the F-15E Strike Eagle.

Production F-23
The proposed production F-23 configuration (DP231 for the F119 engine and DP232 for the F120 engine) for full-scale development, or Engineering and Manufacturing Development (EMD), would have differed from the YF-23 prototypes in several ways. Instead of a single weapons bay, the EMD design would instead have two tandem bays in the lengthened forward fuselage, with the fore bay designed for short range AIM-9 missiles; an M61 rotary cannon would be installed on the left side of the forward fuselage. The aircraft's overall length was slightly increased, volume was expanded, the nose was enlarged to accept mission systems, including the radar, and the forebody chines were less pronounced and raised to the same height as the leading edge of the wing. The deletion of thrust reversers enabled the engine nacelles to have a smaller, more rounded cross-section and the space between them filled in to preserve area-ruling. The inlet design changed from the porous panels to a semicircular compression bump. The fuselage and empennage trailing edge pattern would also have fewer serrations and the engine thrust lines were toed in at 1.5° off center.

NATF-23
The NATF-23, the schematics of which surfaced in the 2010s, was different in many ways, the diamond wing was located as far back as possible, it has conventional twin tails instead of the ruddervator with serrations for low RCS and increased maneuverability at low speeds for aircraft carrier operations, folding wing capability for flight deck storage, reinforced landing gear, tailhook and canards for landing on aircraft carriers and thrust vectoring nozzles. The intakes were also different as they were a quarter circle with serrations and were to have an increased 48 ft wingspan and a 62 ft length.

Operational history

Evaluation
The first YF-23, with Pratt & Whitney engines, supercruised at Mach 1.43 on 18 September 1990, while the second, with General Electric engines, reached Mach 1.6 on 29 November 1990. By comparison, the YF-22 achieved Mach 1.58 in supercruise. The YF-23 was tested to a top speed of Mach 1.8 with afterburners and achieved a maximum angle-of-attack of 25°. The maximum speed is classified, though sources state a maximum speed greater than Mach 2 at altitude and a supercruise speed greater than Mach 1.6. The aircraft's weapons bay was configured for weapons launch, and used for testing weapons bay acoustics, but no missiles were fired; Lockheed fired AIM-9 Sidewinder and AIM-120 AMRAAM missiles successfully from its YF-22 demonstration aircraft. PAV-1 performed a fast-paced combat demonstration with six flights over a 10-hour period on 30 November 1990. Flight testing continued into December. The two YF-23s flew 50 times for a total of 65.2 hours. The tests demonstrated Northrop's predicted performance values for the YF-23. The YF-23 was stealthier and faster, but the YF-22 was more agile.

The two contractor teams submitted evaluation results with their proposals in December 1990, and on 23 April 1991, Secretary of the Air Force Donald Rice announced that the YF-22 was the winner. The Air Force selected the YF119 engine to power the F-22 production version. The Lockheed and Pratt & Whitney designs were rated higher on technical aspects, were considered lower risks, and were considered to have more effective program management. It has been speculated in the aviation press that the YF-22 was also seen as more adaptable to the Navy's NATF, but by 1992 the U.S. Navy had abandoned NATF.

Following the competition, both YF-23s were transferred to NASA's Dryden Flight Research Center at Edwards AFB, California, without their engines. NASA planned to use one of the aircraft to study techniques for the calibration of predicted loads to measured flight results, but this did not take place.

Possible revival
In 2004, Northrop Grumman proposed a YF-23-based bomber to meet a USAF need for an interim bomber, for which the FB-22 and B-1R were also competing. Northrop modified aircraft PAV-2 to serve as a display model for its proposed interim bomber. The possibility of a YF-23-based interim bomber ended with the 2006 Quadrennial Defense Review, which favored a long-range bomber with much greater range. The USAF has since moved on to the Next-Generation Bomber and Long Range Strike Bomber program.

Japan launched a program to develop a domestic 5th/6th generation (F-3) fighter after the US Congress refused in 1998 to export the F-22. After a great deal of study and the building of static models, the Mitsubishi X-2 Shinshin testbed aircraft flew as a technology demonstrator from 2016. By July 2018, Japan had gleaned sufficient information and decided that it would need to bring on-board international partners to complete this project. One such company that responded was Northrop Grumman and there is speculation that it could offer a modernized version of the YF-23 to Japan.

Aircraft on display

Both YF-23 airframes remained in storage until mid-1996, when the aircraft were transferred to museums.
 YF-23A PAV-1, Air Force serial number 87-0800, registration number N231YF, is on display in the Research and Development hangar of the National Museum of the United States Air Force near Dayton, Ohio.

 YF-23A PAV-2, AF ser. no. 87-0801, registration number N232YF, was on exhibit at the Western Museum of Flight until 2004, when it was reclaimed by Northrop Grumman and used as a display model for a YF-23-based bomber. PAV-2 was returned to the Western Museum of Flight and was on display as of 2010 at the museum's new location at Zamperini Field, Torrance, California.

Specifications (YF-23)

See also

References

Notes

Citations

Bibliography

 Aronstein, David C. and Michael J. Hirschberg. Advanced Tactical Fighter to F-22 Raptor: Origins of the 21st Century Air Dominance Fighter. Arlington, Virginia: AIAA (American Institute of Aeronautics & Astronautics), 1998. .
 Goodall, James C. "The Lockheed YF-22 and Northrop YF-23 Advanced Tactical Fighters". America's Stealth Fighters and Bombers, B-2, F-117, YF-22, and YF-23. St. Paul, Minnesota: Motorbooks International Publishing, 1992. .
 Jenkins, Dennis R. and Tony R. Landis. Experimental & Prototype U.S. Air Force Jet Fighters. North Branch, Minnesota: Specialty Press, 2008. .
 Metz, Paul. Air Force Legends Number 220. Northrop YF-23. Forrest Lake, Minnesota: Specialty Press, 2017 
 Miller, Jay. Lockheed Martin F/A-22 Raptor, Stealth Fighter. Hinckley, UK: Midland Publishing, 2005. .
 Pace, Steve. F-22 Raptor. New York: McGraw-Hill, 1999. .
 Sweetman, Bill. YF-22 and YF-23 Advanced Tactical Fighters. St. Paul, Minnesota: Motorbooks International Publishing, 1991. .
 Williams, Mel, ed. "Lockheed Martin F-22A Raptor", Superfighters: The Next Generation of Combat Aircraft. London: AIRtime Publishing, 2002. .
 Winchester, Jim, ed. "Northrop/McDonnell Douglas YF-23", Concept Aircraft. Rochester, Kent, UK: Grange Books, 2005. .

External links

 YF-23 photos on DFRC/NASA site
 "YF-23 Black Widow II, Declassified: Web of Secrecy" – documentary film (2000)
 Northrop/McDonnell Douglas YF-23 page on Joe Baugher's site
 YF-23 "Black Widow II", Northrop/McDonnell Douglas page on fighter-planes.com

F-023
F-023
Stealth aircraft
Northrop F-23
V-tail aircraft
Twinjets
Mid-wing aircraft
Aircraft first flown in 1990
Cancelled military aircraft projects of the United States